Oberto Cattaneo Lazzari (Genoa, 1473Genoa, 10 December 1533) was the 46th Doge of the Republic of Genoa, the first with a two-year mandate.

Biography 
Elected on 11 October 1528, he worked immediately for the development of the port of Genoa, with reinforcement works, and the various appointments of the respective captains of the Genoese galleys. Historical sources of the time testified with great solemnity, among others, the appointment of Admiral Filippino Doria, which took place on 24 April 1529, with the delivery of the ancient banner of San Giorgio after the solemn Mass inside the Cathedral of San Lorenzo.

On 12 October 1530, upon the effective expiry of the mandate, theoretically ceased any activity of institutional power, but at the request of the Twelve Reformers, he actually held the position until the appointment of his successor, which took place on 4 January with the election of Battista Spinola. 
Oberto Cattaneo Lazzari died in Genoa on 10 December 1533 and was buried in the church of San Domenico.

See also 
 Republic of Genoa
 Doge of Genoa

References 

16th-century Doges of Genoa
1473 births
1533 deaths